is a Japanese actress, gravure idol and model. In February 2017, she announced her temporary retirement from the entertainment industry to join the controversial Happy Science religion, declaring she had been a member of the group since childhood under the influence of her parents, both of whom have been devout believers in Happy Science for a long time. Through Happy Science, she announced a return to acting under her new name  with Happy Science's ARI Production company. On the same month, Kana-Boon's Yuma Meshida apologized for being in an adulterous relationship with her.

Shimizu had her first major role as Yuki Jojima in Kamen Rider Fourze followed by appearances as Aiko Himeno in HK!!! Hentai Kamen and in NHK's Mare.

Filmography

TV series

Anime

Films

References

External links
 Official profile at LesPros Entertainment
 Official blog at LesPros Entertainment
 Official blog at Ameba

1994 births
Converts to new religious movements
Living people
Japanese film actresses
Actresses from Tokyo
Japanese gravure models
Japanese female models
21st-century Japanese actresses
Japanese television actresses